The Treasure of Vaghia (Greek: Ο θησαυρός της Βαγίας) is a 1969 novel by Greek author Georges Sari. It is her first novel and is partially autobiographical. A television series based upon the book aired on Ellinikí Radiofonía Tileórasi in 1984.

Plot summary

This summer a group of children spend a wonderful holiday on the Greek island of Aegina. The arrival of a beloved French friend, a young psychiatrist working in Paris, will bring, apart from joy, a mission. To find a hidden treasure that could help a falling friend drive away his demons.
A novel of strong emotion, full of adventure and rich descriptions, where the author perfectly recreates the particular atmosphere of children’s summertime on an island.

References

1969 novels
Greek novels
Aegina
Autobiographical novels